Emil Iversen (born 12 August 1991) is a Norwegian cross-country skier who represents IL Varden. He is 2019 World Champion in team sprint and 4 × 10 km relay.

Athletic career
2010/11
Iversen was junior world champion in the relay in 2011 with Sindre Bjørnestad Skar, Mathias Rundgreen and Erik Bergfall Brovold. He debuted in the FIS Cross-Country World Cup in Lillehammer on 7 December 2013.

2015/16
Iversen won his first World Cup stage race on 5 January 2016 in the classic sprint stage of the Tour de Ski in Oberstdorf. He won his second World Cup in the skate sprint in Lahti on 20 February 2016. He won his third World Cup in the 17.5 km classic mass start stage in Montréal on 2 March 2016.

Cross-country skiing results
All results are sourced from the International Ski Federation (FIS).

Olympic Games
 1 medal – (1 silver)

Distance reduced to 30 km due to weather conditions.

World Championships
4 medals – (4 gold)

World Cup

Season standings

Individual podiums
 8 victories – (3 , 5 ) 
 26 podiums – (13 , 13 )

Team podiums
 4 victories – (3 , 1 ) 
 6 podiums – (5 , 1 )

References

External links

 
 
 
 

1991 births
Living people
Norwegian male cross-country skiers
Cross-country skiers at the 2018 Winter Olympics
Cross-country skiers at the 2022 Winter Olympics
Tour de Ski skiers
Olympic cross-country skiers of Norway
FIS Nordic World Ski Championships medalists in cross-country skiing
Medalists at the 2022 Winter Olympics
Olympic silver medalists for Norway
Olympic medalists in cross-country skiing
21st-century Norwegian people